Saskia Giorgini (born 1985) is an Italian-Dutch pianist who won the Salzburg International Mozart Competition in 2016. She made her debut at the Vienna Musikverein in February 2017 playing an all Mozart recital. Her recording of Liszt’s Harmonies Poétiques et Religieuses was released on the Pentatone label in 2021 to great acclaim, winning a Diaposon d’Or.

References

External links 
https://www.musikverein.at/konzerte/abonnements2016.php?abo_id=1169&lang=en 
Konzert zeigt Todesahnung mit Schwung
YouTube recording of "Winterreise" with Ian Bostridge

Italian women pianists
Living people
21st-century pianists
1985 births
21st-century women pianists